In theoretical computer science, DEVS is closed under coupling [Zeigper84] [ZPK00]. In other words, given a coupled DEVS model , its behavior is described as an atomic DEVS model .  For a given coupled DEVS , once we have an equivalent atomic DEVS , behavior of  can be referred to behavior of atomic DEVS which is based on Timed Event System.

Similar to behavior of atomic DEVS, behavior of the Coupled DEVS class is described depending on definition of the total state set and its handling as follows.

View1: Total states = states * elapsed times 
Given a coupled DEVS model , its behavior is described as an atomic DEVS model 

where
  is the partial state set where  is the total state set of component  (Refer to View1 of Behavior of DEVS), where  is the set of non-negative real numbers.
  is the initial state set where  is the total initial state of component .
 is the time advance function, where  is the set of non-negative real numbers plus infinity. Given ,   
 
 
 is the external state function.  Given a total state  where , and input event , the next state is given by 
where

Given the partial state , let  denote the set of imminent components. The firing component  which triggers the internal state transition and an output event is determined by 

 is the internal state function.  Given a partial state , the next state is given by 
where

 is the output function.  Given a partial state ,

View2: Total states = states * lifespan * elapsed times 
Given a coupled DEVS model , its behavior is described as an atomic DEVS model 

where
  is the partial state set where  is the total state set of component  (Refer to View2 of Behavior of DEVS).
  is the initial state set where  is the total initial state of component .
 is the time advance function. Given ,  
 
 
 is the external state function.  Given a total state  where , and input event , the next state is given by 
where

and

Given the partial state , let  denote the set of imminent components. The firing component  which triggers the internal state transition and an output event is determined by 

 is the internal state function.  Given a partial state , the next state is given by 
where

 is the output function.  Given a partial state ,

Time passage 
Since in a coupled DEVS model with non-empty sub-components, i.e., the number of clocks which trace their elapsed times are multiple, so time passage of the model is noticeable. 
For View1  
Given a total state   where 

If unit event segment  is  the null event segment, i.e.  , the state trajectory in terms of Timed Event System is   
 

 For View2 
Given a total state   where 

If unit event segment  is  the null event segment, i.e.  , the state trajectory in terms of Timed Event System is

Remarks 
 The behavior of a couple DEVS network whose all sub-components are deterministic DEVS models can be non-deterministic if  is non-deterministic.

See also
DEVS
Behavior of Atomic DEVS
Simulation Algorithms for Coupled DEVS
Simulation Algorithms for Atomic DEVS

References 
 [Zeigler84] 
 [ZKP00] 

Automata (computation)
Formal specification languages